Festuca paniculata (east Alpine violet fescue) is a grass with culms 60–120 cm long, endemic to central, southwestern, and southeastern Europe and northern Africa.

Synonyms
 Anthoxanthum paniculatum L.
 Festuca anthoxanthia Sm.
 Festuca aurea Lam.
 Festuca baetica (Hack.) Hack. ex Asch. & Graebn.
 Festuca baetica (Hack.) Richt.
 Festuca baetica subsp. moleroi (Cebolla & Rivas Ponce) Cebolla & Rivas Ponce
 Festuca bulbosa Delarbre
 Festuca caerulescens Boiss. ex Hack.
 Festuca compressa DC.
 Festuca consobrina Timb.-Lagr.
 Festuca durandoi subsp. fontqueri (Rivas Ponce & Cebolla) Llamas, Acedo, Penas & Pérez Morales
 Festuca ferruginea (Vest) Rchb.
 Festuca fibrosa Griseb.
 Festuca fleischeri Steud.
 Festuca fusca Vill.
 Festuca gigantea Krock.
 Festuca montis-celtici Delarbre
 Festuca paniculata subsp. baetica (Hack.) Emb. & Maire
 Festuca paniculata var. baetica (Hack.) Maire & Weiller
 Festuca paniculata subsp. baetica (Hack.) Markgr.-Dann.
 Festuca paniculata var. capillifolia (Pau ex Willk.) O.Bolòs & Vigo	Synonym
 Festuca paniculata subsp. consobrina (Timb.-Lagr.) Markgr.-Dann.
 Festuca paniculata subsp. consobrina (Timb.-Lagr.) Soják
 Festuca paniculata subsp. fontqueri Rivas Ponce & Cebolla
 Festuca paniculata subsp. longiglumis (Litard.) Kerguélen
 Festuca paniculata var. longiglumis (Litard.) Cebolla
 Festuca paniculata subsp. macrostachys Llamas, Acedo, Penas & Pérez Morales
 Festuca paniculata subsp. moleri (Cebolla & Rivas Ponce) Rivas Mart. & Asensi & Molero Mesa & F. Valle
 Festuca paniculata subsp. moleroi (Cebolla & Rivas Ponce) Rivas Mart., A.Asensi, Molero Mesa & F.Valle
 Festuca paniculata var. moleroi Cebolla, Lozano & Rivas Ponce
 Festuca paniculata subsp. multispiculata Rivas Ponce & Cebolla
 Festuca paniculata subsp. paui Cebolla & Rivas Ponce
 Festuca paniculata subsp. spadicea (L.) Litard.
 Festuca paradoxa Ehrh. ex Steud.
 Festuca spadicea L.
 Festuca spadicea var. baetica Hack.
 Festuca spadicea var. capillifolia Pau ex Willk.
 Festuca spadicea subsp. longiglumis (Litard.) Kerguélen
 Poa gerardii All.
 Poa montana Delarbre
 Poa spadicea (L.) Koeler
 Poa triflora Moench
 Schedonorus aureus (Lam.) P.Beauv.
 Schedonorus compressus (DC.) Roem. & Schult.
 Schedonorus consobrinus Timb.-Lagr.
 Schedonorus ferrugineus Vest
 Schedonorus × fleischeri (Dörfl.) Holub
 Schedonorus spadiceus (L.) Roem. & Schult.

References
 The Plant List entry
 Kew GrassBase entry
 JSTOR paper
 Wiley Plant Biology paper
 Hortipedia entry

paniculata